Angelo John "Tony" Giuliani (November 24, 1912 – October 8, 2004) was an American catcher in Major League Baseball in 1936–41 and 1943. Born in St. Paul, Minnesota, he attended Saint Thomas Military Academy and has been selected to its Athletic Hall of Fame. He also attended the University of Saint Thomas and the Catholic University of America.

His pro career, curtailed by injury, extended for 12 seasons (1932–43) with a one-game appearance in 1949 as a member of the Triple-A Minneapolis Millers.

During his 243-game MLB career, Giuliani collected 157 hits, with 18 doubles and three triples his only blows for extra bases. 

After his playing career, he became a longtime scout. He died in Saint Paul at age 91.

References

External links

1912 births
2004 deaths
Baseball players from Saint Paul, Minnesota
Brooklyn Dodgers players
Dallas Steers players
Detroit Tigers scouts
Major League Baseball catchers
Montreal Royals players
Minneapolis Millers (baseball) players
Minnesota Twins scouts
New York Giants (NL) scouts
St. Louis Browns players
St. Paul Saints (AA) players
Washington Senators (1901–1960) players
Washington Senators (1901–60) scouts